My Little Pony: Equestria Girls is an animated web series based on Hasbro's toyline and media franchise of the same name, itself being a spin-off of the 2010 relaunch of Hasbro's My Little Pony toyline. It focuses on the main characters from the television series My Little Pony: Friendship Is Magic, re-envisioned as human teenagers attending high school. The series premiered on November 17, 2017, on YouTube. The first season was marketed with the theme "Better Together".

The series ended its run following its second season on June 23, 2020, after DHX Media Vancouver (now operating under its current name, WildBrain) had left its production in 2019.

Production and release
This series marks the debut of a new wardrobe for the main characters. The girls' new wardrobes were designed by celebrity fashion stylist Laura Schuffman.

In January 2020, YouTube amended its policies regarding child-oriented videos, after the service was fined by the United States Federal Trade Commission for violating Children's Online Privacy Protection Act (COPPA) in September 2019. Under the revised policies, the operators of a YouTube channel need to mark a child-oriented video (or entire channel aimed at children) as such; the marked videos are restricted from utilizing certain functions of YouTube, including on-screen interactivity. The "You Choose the Ending" interactive shorts as uploaded on YouTube were affected by the change.

In March 2021, writer and story editor Nick Confalone revealed that the writing crew had plans for a third season as well as a proper ending for the series, but Hasbro was uninterested.

Character voices

Main character voices

Supporting character voices

Series overview

Episodes

Season 1 (2017–2018)
Season 1 contains 37 episodes (including the 10 interactive episodes), with the first episode premiering on November 17, 2017. The season took a short break in Spring 2018, and an extended summer break before the final short, which broadcast on October 5, 2018.

Shorts

Notes

You Choose the Ending

Season 2 (2019–2020)
Season 2 began shortly after the end of the first season, on January 11, 2019. The season had a mini break from April 12 until May 17, and again from July 12 to August 23, 2019, before taking a six-month hiatus in September 2019. The season resumed in March 2020, with a music video in commemoration of International Women's Day. The season finally ended with the special "Tip Toppings", which aired on June 23, 2020.

Shorts

You Choose the Ending

Notes

References

My Little Pony: Equestria Girls
My Little Pony television series
2017 web series debuts
2020 web series endings
2010s American animated television series
2010s Canadian animated television series
2020s American animated television series
2020s Canadian animated television series
American children's animated comedy television series
American children's animated fantasy television series
American children's animated supernatural television series
American flash animated web series
Canadian children's animated comedy television series
Canadian children's animated fantasy television series
Canadian children's animated supernatural television series
Television series by DHX Media
Television series by Hasbro Studios
Magical girl television series
American comedy web series
Flash cartoons
YouTube original programming